Chiki Sampath (9 December 1920 – 11 March 1990) was a Trinidadian cricketer. He played in six first-class matches for Trinidad and Tobago from 1948 to 1954.

See also
 List of Trinidadian representative cricketers

References

External links
 

1920 births
1990 deaths
Trinidad and Tobago cricketers